Rhabdatomis is a genus of moths in the subfamily Arctiinae. The genus was erected by Harrison Gray Dyar Jr. in 1907.

Species
Rhabdatomis cora (Dyar, 1907)
Rhabdatomis dognini Field, 1964
Rhabdatomis draudti Field, 1964
Rhabdatomis extensa Field, 1964
Rhabdatomis fasseli Field, 1964
Rhabdatomis knabi Field, 1964
Rhabdatomis laudamia (H. Druce, 1885)
Rhabdatomis mandana (Dyar, 1907)
Rhabdatomis melinda (Schaus, 1911)
Rhabdatomis pueblae (Draudt, 1919)
Rhabdatomis zaba Dyar, 1907

References

Cisthenina
Moth genera